This page lists the World Best Year Performance in the year 2008 in both the men's and the women's hammer throw. The main event during this season were the Olympic Games in Beijing, PR China, where the final of the men's competition was held on August 17, 2008. The women had their final three days later, on August 20, 2008 in the Beijing National Stadium.

Men

Records

2008 World Year Ranking

Women

Records

2008 World Year Ranking

References
tilastopaja
IAAF
apulanta

2008
Hammer Throw Year Ranking, 2008